Jarkko Nieminen was the defending champion, but chose not to compete this year.
Rui Machado defeated Maxime Teixeira 6–3, 6–7(7–9), 6–4 in the final.

Seeds

Draw

Finals

Top half

Bottom half

References
Main draw
Qualifying Singles

2011,Singles
Marrakech,Singles